Honchun Ngandam is an Indian politician and member of the Bharatiya Janata Party. Ngandam was a member of the Arunachal Pradesh Legislative Assembly from the Pongchau-Wakka constituency in Longding district. He is Minister of Rural Works Department in Pema Khandu government.

References 

People from Longding district
Bharatiya Janata Party politicians from Arunachal Pradesh
Living people
21st-century Indian politicians
Indian National Congress politicians
People's Party of Arunachal politicians
Year of birth missing (living people)
Naga people
Arunachal Pradesh MLAs 1995–1999
Arunachal Pradesh MLAs 2004–2009
Arunachal Pradesh MLAs 2009–2014
Arunachal Pradesh MLAs 2014–2019
Arunachal Pradesh MLAs 2019–2024